I Remember Charlie Parker is a 1979 album by American jazz guitarist Joe Pass. A solo-guitar tribute to jazz musician Charlie Parker, it was re-issued in 1991 on CD by Original Jazz Classics.

Track listing
"Just Friends" (John Klenner, Sam M. Lewis) – 4:26
"Easy to Love" (Cole Porter) – 4:00
"Summertime" (George Gershwin, Ira Gershwin, DuBose Heyward) – 4:09
"April in Paris" (Vernon Duke, E. Y. Harburg) – 4:05
"Everything Happens to Me" (Tom Adair, Matt Dennis) – 4:32
"Laura" (Johnny Mercer, David Raksin) – 4:10
"They Can't Take That Away from Me" (George Gershwin, Ira Gershwin) – 4:43
"I Didn't Know What Time It Was" (Richard Rodgers, Lorenz Hart) – 4:40
"If I Should Lose You" (Ralph Rainger, Leo Robin) – 4:34
"Out of Nowhere" (Johnny Green, Edward Heyman) – 5:19
"Out of Nowhere" (concept version) – 3:52

Personnel
 Joe Pass - guitar
Val Valentin – engineer

Chart positions

References

1979 albums
Charlie Parker tribute albums
Joe Pass albums
Albums produced by Norman Granz
Pablo Records albums